Armour with two or more plates spaced a distance apart falls under the category of spaced armour. Spaced armour can be sloped or unsloped. When sloped, it reduces the penetrating power of bullets and solid shot, as after penetrating each plate projectiles tend to tumble, deflect, deform, or disintegrate; spaced armour that is not sloped is generally designed to provide protection from explosive projectiles, which detonate before reaching the primary armour. Spaced armour is used on military vehicles such as tanks and combat bulldozers. In a less common application, it is used in some spacecraft that use Whipple shields.

Against kinetic penetrators
The first spaced armour was used on iron and steel warships from the mid-19th century. Between the thin outer armour of various less important parts and the thick main armour (protecting turrets, ammunition depots, boilers and turbines) were constructed storage spaces, coal or oil bunkers, and so on (Lord Nelson class). Some ships (e.g. Tirpitz, Takao, King George) had thicker outer and thinner inner layers to lower the damage caused by the penetrating round. From 1900 some cruisers and battleships were built with modern spaced armour, where the outer thin layer was intended only to damage the projectiles (e.g. Littorio class).

Torpedo bulkheads also serve as a special form of spaced armour for naval vessels.

Tank spaced armour has been fielded since the First World War, when it was fitted to the French Schneider CA1 and Saint-Chamond tanks. The late variants of Panzer III had frontal spaced armour: a 20 mm thick face-hardened steel layer in front of the 50 mm thick main armour. Impacted projectiles were physically damaged by the 20mm plate, so the main armour could withstand much greater hits. Due to lack of materials, German industry eventually switched to Rolled Homogeneous Armour (RHA), which is less effective and due to the slower production process, the technique was not widespread on German tanks.

It is important in designing of integral spaced armour that each layer should be thick enough to cause adequate damage to the projectile or jet. So the thickness of every layer should reach roughly the half of the diameter of projectile expected to impact.

Many World War II-era German tanks used armoured skirts (Schürzen) to make their thinner side-armour more resistant to anti-tank rifles. Contrary to popular belief the German Schürzen were designed against kinetic (AP, APBC, APCBC) projectiles. The effectiveness of conventional AP projectiles was significantly reduced if they broke through a thin plate or dense wire net, because the projectiles become unstable in their trajectory and their tip would also be damaged. This method was very effective against contemporary light anti-tank weapons, like the Soviet 14.5 mm PTRD-41 anti-tank rifle and 45 mm M1937 anti-tank gun, the British 57mm Ordnance QF 6-pounder, and the US 37mm gun.

Some armoured vehicles used nets of wooden logs at a certain distance from the hull as makeshift spaced armour to protect the vehicle from magnetic mines, thrown shaped charges and grenades, and occasionally suicidal methods (e.g. the Japanese lunge mine). This method occurred on US M4 Sherman and Soviet T-34 medium tanks among others.

Against high explosive anti-tank rounds
Most of the Cold War spaced armour was designed against medium-to-low caliber kinetic munitions, (e.g. 30mm autocannon and 76mm HESH rounds), especially vehicle side skirts. Most of them were made of RHA plates (Centurion), or thick reinforced rubbers (T-72), and worked in the same way as did WW2-era ones.

This light armour also detonates explosive warheads prematurely. High-explosive anti-tank-type warheads (HEAT) use a focused hypervelocity jet of copper or steel to penetrate armour. To be effective, HEAT warheads must detonate at a specific distance from the target's primary armour to ensure maximum penetration. Thus early detonation greatly reduces the penetration of HEAT ammunition. This requires a distance of 1.2 meters even for an early 100mm projectile, thus conventional skirts are effective against HEAT only at very low angle of incidence.

The use of add-on spaced armour skirts can sometimes have the opposite effect and increase the penetration of some shaped charge warheads. Due to constraints in the length of projectiles, some designs intentionally detonate closer than the optimum distance. In such cases, the skirting effectively increases the distance between the armour and the target, and the warhead detonates closer to its optimum stand-off.

To increase effectiveness of skirts against HEAT weapons some mid-cold-war tanks (early T-64s) had gill-style armour. It contained a few short skirts on the side of the vehicle which are opened in open terrain at an angle of between 30–45°, increasing the space between the armour and the plate. It was effective (mass-to-efficiency ratio), but easily detached from the vehicle so it did not spread widely.

A special version of reactive spaced armour is slat armour. It uses the power of the impacting projectile (RPG, ATGM) to destroy them. Steel slats placed at a specified distance have a 50–60% chance of breaking an RPG-7's warhead so no cumulative beam can be formed. It also provides some protection against  grenades.

In response to increasingly effective HEAT, HESH and APFSDS warheads, integral spaced armour was reintroduced in the 1960s on the German Leopard 1 and later the Merkava. Spaces between plates increase the distance a projectile must travel to reach the interior of a vehicle. Sometimes the interior surfaces of these cavities are sloped, presenting angles to the anticipated path of the shaped charge's jet or kinetic penetrator to further dissipate their power. The two (or more) layered spaced RHA armour were highly effective against early steel and tungsten APFSDS munitions, because the rod was severely damaged by penetrating the first layer and was thus ineffective on the inner armour. Therefore, a much thinner total steel thickness and weight was enough against a specific projectile. For example, a given weight of armour can be distributed in two layers 15 cm (6 in) thick instead of a single 30 cm (12 in) layer, giving much better protection against HESH and APDS munitions, but their effect on shaped charges was limited. So military researchers tried to increase the efficiency of spaced armour by changing the used materials and increasing the number of layers, from the early sixties.

Composite spaced armour 
Multilayer spaced armour, which also use special materials, are a transition to composite armour, most of the latter are also partially spaced armour.

In the case of the Leopard 1A3 and later variants, the outer layer of spaced armour was hardened steel and the space was filled by elastomer, thus the effectiveness of the shattering effect of the outer layer against APFSDS was outstanding, and the protection against early HEAT warheads was increased, too. The BDD add-on armour of T-55 and T-62 series based on the same effect, but it had multiple layers within elastomer, therefore it roughly doubled the frontal protection of these tanks against APDS and HEAT weapons, and made the areas of add-on immune to HESH rounds. In T-64 and early T-72 (up to T-72M1) and T-80 (to mid T-80A) used stakloplastika (a special military-grade dense glass-fiber reinforced pressured plastic) as filling in the frontal upper glacis spaced armour. This plastic was effective in lowering the concentration of the jet of shaped charges and in destabilizing kinetic penetrators.

Hardened steel plates have become commonplace for outer part of spaced armour from the 1980s, not only on tanks but also on APCs and IFVs. With this add-on armour, even the APC's thin armour is sufficient against kinetic bullets of 12.7 mm (Stryker and BTR-80 upgrades) and 14.5 mm (Bradley, BMP-3) and also provides some protection against IEDs.

The increase in the number of layers in spaced armour increases the physical damage and destabilization of jets and kinetic penetrators, so it is common in more modern armour to use successive layers alternating between softer (air, aluminium or plastic) and harder (RHA, SHS) layers. With multiple layers the likelihood of a bounce in case of kinetic projectiles is also increased. Thus, later T-72B and T-90 armour used  seven-layered spaced armour (with hardened steel plates) to achieve much stronger protection at a cost of minimal weight increases.

The more advanced late Cold War tanks were given multi-layer skirts (Leopard 2), in which passive (or reactive) effects significantly reduced the effectiveness of HEAT ammunition. At the same time, these elements are already heavy and have considerable thickness, which increases the size and weight of the vehicle and make maintenance difficult. Russian and some Western tanks carry explosive-reactive armour blocks to increase the effectiveness of spaced armour (particularly in the case of side skirts, e.g. TUSK and T-90), and main frontal armour.

Almost all modern Western and Japanese and most Soviet tanks used some kind of spaced armour on the fronts and sides. Side panels of superstructures usually contain fuel, batteries and other less vital elements or munition of secondary weapons, because they also reduce the effectiveness of penetrating projectiles. In the most important areas (frontal armour and sides of turret) the cavity of spaced armour contains composite panels. From the 1980s, most  Western tanks have composite armour blocks on the frontal part of the skirts, made of hardened steel or NERA armour (non-explosive-reactive armour, known as "Burlinghton armour"). Most modern MBTs (e.g. T-72B, Leopard 2, M1, Type 10, K2, T-90, Type96) have NERA armour in their spaced armour which supplement the inner ceramic armour and spall liners in some cases. In contrast, Soviet tanks were initially made with ceramic (corundum or silicate) inserts (T-64A, T-72A, T-72M1, T-80) and NERA-style inserts spread in the upgraded versions of their vehicles later (T-72B, T-80A, T-72BU). More detail in composite armour.

Currently, composite spaced armour with hardened steel outer layer (often filled with NERA or ceramic inserts) are becoming more common on most advanced light battle tanks (ZTQ-15) and IFVs (Namer, Puma).

Materials
As designs became more specialized, more and more materials were used. The most important are:

Elastomers 
Some modern main battle tanks (MBTs) and IFVs carry rubber or steel (hardened in some cases) skirts to protect their relatively fragile suspension and lower side armour and lower glacis, often combining the two. Some elastomer fillings (e.g. M551's floating cells and screens, T-72B's radiation protection layer) behave like spaced armour, where the elastic layer effectively lowers the concentration of the jet of HEAT warheads. Leopard 1A3 and 1A4 and add-on armour of T-55 and T-62 used dense polystyrene filling to increasing the effectiveness of spaced armour. The early second generation Russian MBTs used dense glass-fiber reinforced pressured plastic as filling in the frontal upper glacis spaced armour which is even more effective than the pure elastomer.

NERA armour also use elastomers pressed between two or three sheets steel or aluminium layers, it acts as ERA armour with lesser effectiveness, but is not destroyed during operation, so it can hold multiple hits in the same place. Most of the modern MBTs use some NERA layer within their spaced armour, or as an outer layer.

Hardened steel 
Whereas normal armour must compromise between hardness and ductility, spaced armour can be constructed from plates with differing material properties to increase effectiveness against kinetic energy penetrators. Most of the Cold War and modern spaced armours use rolled homogeneous armour as the inner layer and a thin (10–30 mm) face-hardened, semi-hardened steel plate as the outer layer. The thin but very hard outer layer acts as a burster and shatter plate, which allows the main armour to be designed much thinner with the same protection level. The most advanced designs use triple- or high-hardened steel. In some cases aluminium is added to hardened steel armour as a softer inter-layer to destabilise the projectiles and HEAT jets by density changes.

The Leopard 2 uses a slanted first armour stage (disturber), a specially hardened second stage (disrupter) and a softer, high ductility third stage (absorber). The disturber is designed to either entirely deflect or manipulate the direction of incoming kinetic energy penetrators. If penetration does occur, the projectile is then shattered and fragmented when striking the disrupter. Assuming the first two stages work properly, the absorber stage captures spalling and fragments.

Others 
Some armoured fighting vehicles use the cavity of their spaced armour as fuel tanks or storage spaces, and warships used them as coal or oil bunkers, and rooms for non-vital components (e.g. washing rooms, food storage). The materials filling these spaces could further slow down the penetrating projectile, increasing the protection. Modern AFVs spaced armour contain special fillings forming composite armours.

Spacecraft
The Whipple shield uses the principle of spaced armour to protect spacecraft from the impacts of very fast micrometeoroids.  The impact with the first wall melts or breaks up the incoming particle, causing fragments to be spread over a wider area when striking the subsequent walls.

References 

Vehicle armour